Dongfeng is a town of Hailun City in west-central Heilongjiang province, China, located about  from downtown Hailun. , it has 13 villages under its administration.

See also 
 List of township-level divisions of Heilongjiang

References 

Township-level divisions of Heilongjiang